The arrest of Robert Jonathan Seacat was the culmination of a destructive 19.48-hour standoff with American police in June 2015.  After being chased by police for stealing clothing from a Walmart, Seacat barricaded himself in the Greenwood Village, Colorado house at 4219 South Alton Street.  By the time Seacat was finally extracted from the premises, the house had been destroyed by law-enforcement in their efforts.  The homeowner—Leo Lech—filed a lawsuit against the municipality for compensation, but was ruled against by the United States Court of Appeals for the Tenth Circuit; he appealed to the Supreme Court of the United States, but the court declined to hear the case.

Background
With previous convictions for drug possession, aggravated motor vehicle theft, and burglary, on June 3, 2015, Seacat also had three outstanding warrants: two for illegal drugs and one for aggravated motor vehicle theft.

Leo and Alfonsia Lech bought the house at 4219 South Alton Street, Greenwood Village, Colorado for their son, John. John Lech would later tell police that he kept an unloaded pistol and 20-gauge shotgun in the master closet, while ammunition was kept elsewhere in the house.

Standoff
According to a police affidavit, it was June 3, 2015 when Seacat shoplifted two belts and a shirt from a Walmart in Greenwood Village, Colorado.  After assaulting a uniformed Aurora Police Department (APD) officer—John Reiter—with his gold-colored 1999 Lexus GS300, Seacat fled in the vehicle.  Reiter soon found the abandoned car at the nearby Dayton station and radioed for a tow; after watching Seacat run across northbound Interstate 225, a by-stander alerted the officer that she saw Seacat holster a .380 ACP semi-automatic pistol when he crossed the rail platform.  Reiter lost track of Seacat and returned to the Lexus to inventory its contents:  in cash,  of psilocybin mushrooms,  of cannabis, and an unidentified  blue pill.

Between 1:43–1:54pm, a perimeter was established by Greenwood Village (GVPD) and Aurora police. At 1:54pm, Seacat entered the home at 4219 South Alton Street in Greenwood Village, twice tripping the security alarm as he did so. Inside the home was the nine-year-old son of resident Anna Mumzhiyan, and when he exited the house at 2:17pm, the child described Seacat as the man currently inside the house.

GVPD Commander Dustin Varney arrived at South Alton Street, took command of the situation, and summoned GVPD SWAT as well as further assistance from the APD, the Arapahoe County sheriff's office, and the Douglas County sheriff's office.  GVPD officer Mic Smith, a SWAT negotiator, engaged with Seacat over the telephone; by 6:08pm, Seacat ceased communicating with police, despite the application of inductive irritants.

At 10:38pm, SWAT entered the house and used a stun grenade to conceal their movements, but were driven back outside by gunshots (though criminalists would later establish that they were not fired upon). During the next 10.2 hours, a Lenco BearCat was driven through the front door, tear gas and 40 mm grenades were repeatedly launched inside, shots were fired upon the house, and explosives were detonated to destroy several exterior walls. Ultimately, "the home was utterly destroyed" by the time Seacat was apprehended in the upstairs bathroom.

Aftermath

In their subsequent search of the house, police found Lech's over and under shotgun unloaded and still in its case.  In the master bathroom, police found a loaded Glock 17,  of suspected methamphetamine,  of methadone,  of diazepam,  of suspected heroin, 17.5 pills of methylphenidate,  of clonazepam,  of cannabis, 61 packets of buprenorphine/naloxone, digital weighing scales, dozens of single-use baggies, used syringes and pipes, cash, and multiple cell phones.  Another  of suspected methamphetamine was found in the bathroom where Seacat was captured.  Anthony Costarella, a GVPD officer specialized in narcotics, argued that this cache evidenced Seacat as a drug trafficker.

On June 9, Detective John J. Carr of the GVPD applied for an arrest warrant on Seacat.  The same day, the Arapahoe County, Colorado district attorney filed 32 charges against Seacat: 17 counts of attempted murder in the first degree, one count of first-degree burglary, one count of menacing, one count of attempted motor vehicle theft, four counts of criminal possession of a weapon, three counts of drug possession, one count of trespass, and four counts of being a habitual criminal.  In August 2016, Seacat's jury trial was scheduled for that October 4.

Lechs' litigation

When he returned to his house, Leo Lech said that it looked like Osama bin Laden's compound in Abbottabad after Operation Neptune Spear: "[p]rojectiles were still lodged in the walls. Glass and wooden paneling crumbled on the ground below the gaping holes, and inside, the family's belongings and furniture appeared thrashed in a heap of insulation and drywall."    Varney defended the police's actions by saying, "My mission is to get that individual out unharmed and make sure my team and everyone else around including the community goes home unharmed […] Sometimes that means property gets damaged, and I am sorry for that."  The National Tactical Officers Association supported Varney's assertion that appropriate force was used in the Seacat standoff.

Due to the extensive damage, the house was eventually condemned by Greenwood Village, and the remains were razed. John Lech, his girlfriend, and her son, moved into his father's home  from Greenwood Village. The distance of the relocation forced John Lech to change jobs. The city refused to compensate the Lechs, and instead offered  "in temporary rental assistance and for the [home] insurance deductible." In a 2019 response to an NPR inquiry, Greenwood Village spokesperson Melissa Gallegos told the public broadcaster that it was Leo Lech's decision to: demolish rather than repair the house, replace the undamaged foundation, and build a larger house than the one that was damaged.

In 2016, Leo Lech, his wife Alfonsia Lech, and John Lech filed a lawsuit in the United States District Court for the District of Colorado (D. Colo.) against the participating police officers and Greenwood Village under the takings clause of the Fifth Amendment to the United States Constitution and Article II, Section 15 of the Constitution of Colorado. They claimed that they deserved compensation for "their property [being] seized by the government for public use" (Lech v. Instead, the defendants requested and were granted summary judgment by D. Colo., which ruled that "when a state acts pursuant to its police power, rather than the power of eminent domain, its actions do not constitute a taking". In the past, both the Minnesota and Texas Supreme Courts have sided with litigants whose houses were damaged or destroyed by police actions. The Lechs appealed the ruling to the United States Court of Appeals for the Tenth Circuit (10th Cir.).

In 2019, the three-judge panel of the 10th Cir. ruled against the Lechs, saying unanimously that the destruction of the house fell under police power and that eminent domain was not undertaken.  The court sympathized with the Lechs, calling their circumstances "unfair", but ruling that police cannot be "burdened" with the consideration of collateral property damage when performing their duties.  The 10th Cir. also noted that "if police officers 'willfully or wantonly' destroy property", then they can be subject to tort law; Leo Lech was also unsuccessful in pursuing that avenue with the courts of Colorado.

, Lech had incurred  in attorney's fees.  On March 11, 2020, the Institute for Justice filed a petition for writ of certiorari with the Supreme Court of the United States. The Supreme Court denied certiorari on June 29, 2020, letting the lower court's ruling stand.

References

External links
 

2015 in Colorado
destruction of buildings
law enforcement operations in the United States
law enforcement scandals